Bette Jean Greene (née Evensky; June 28, 1934 – October 2, 2020) was the author of several books for children and young adults, including Summer of My German Soldier, The Drowning of Stephan Jones, and the Newbery Honor book Philip Hall Likes Me, I Reckon Maybe.

Greene was raised in Parkin, Arkansas, where she stuck out as a Jewish girl in the American South during the Great Depression and World War II. Her books focus on themes of injustice and alienation. Her book, Summer of My German Soldier, is based heavily on her childhood. She has received the Golden Kite Award, ALA Notable Book Award, and Newbery Honor.

Biography

Greene was born on June 28, 1934 in Memphis, Tennessee to Arthur Evensky and Sadie (née Steinberg), but was raised in the small city of Parkin, Arkansas, where her parents ran the general store. Her maternal grandparents were Hyman and Tillie Steinberg who had a successful general store in Wynne, Arkansas. As a Jewish girl in a town of Christian fundamentalists, she experienced discrimination and learned what it was like to be an outsider. Since her parents spent a lot of time in their store, Greene was raised mainly by her family's African-American housekeeper, Ruth, who was Greene's model for the character of the same name in Greene's debut novel, Summer of My German Soldier (1973).

Just before Greene entered high school, her family returned to Memphis. Although she began writing for newspapers during her high school years and even won first prize in a local essay contest, she received poor grades in English because of her difficulties with spelling and punctuation. After graduation, she spent a year studying in Paris, France, an experience that would later serve as the background for Morning Is a Long Time Coming (the 1978 sequel to Summer of My German Soldier). After a year abroad, she returned to Memphis and became a reporter for United Press International.

After taking classes at several colleges, Greene enrolled at Columbia University in New York City, where she focused on writing and astronomy. After graduation, she worked as a part-time journalist and a public information officer before marrying physician Donald Sumner Greene and moving with him to Boston. The couple have two grown children; it was after the birth of her daughter Carla that Greene began to write Summer of My German Soldier. The novel took five years to complete; after two more years spent searching for a publisher and eighteen rejections, the book was published by Dial Press in 1973.

Greene died on October 2, 2020 in Lakewood Ranch, Florida.

Bibliography

Other writings

Contributor of articles to periodicals
Short fiction included in anthologies
Creator of Bette Greene Teaches Writing (interactive instructional videos), Christy Johnson Productions, 1999
Author's papers housed in a permanent collection at the Kerlan Collection, University of Minnesota

Awards

Summer of My German Soldier (1973)
1973 Golden Kite Award
New York Times Outstanding Book Award
ALA Notable Book Award
National Book Award Finalist
Massachusetts Children’s Book Award

Philip Hall Likes Me, I Reckon Maybe (1974)
 1975 Newbery Honor
New York Times Outstanding Book Award
New York Times Outstanding Title Award
ALA Notable Children’s Book Award
Child Study Association Children’s Book Award
Kirkus Choice Award

Them That Glitter and Them That Don’t (1983)
Parent’s Choice Award, Parent’s Choice Foundation

Adaptations

Summer of My German Soldier was adapted as a television movie starring Kristy McNichol, Bruce Davison, and Esther Rolle and broadcast by NBC in 1978; The film was released as a filmstrip by Miller-Brody Productions in 1979.

A new musical version of the novel with music and lyrics written in collaboration among Bette Greene, David Brush, and Jim Farley opened in Ohio in August 2003, staged by Encore Theater Company. Summer of My German Soldier also has been released on audio-cassette.

Philip Hall Likes Me, I Reckon Maybe was adapted into a filmstrip by Miller-Brody Productions in 1979. Both books have been released on audiocassette. The Drowning of Stephan Jones was optioned as a film by Telling Pictures.

References

External links

 Green at Facebook
Biography from The Encyclopedia of Arkansas History and Culture
Bette Greene on Understanding Adolescent Homophobia
American Library Association Top 100 Banned/Challenged Books: 2000-2009
American Library Association 100 most frequently challenged books: 1990–1999
Encyclopedia of Arkansas: Bette Evensky Greene
NJEA Review. February, 2010. Bette Greene's “Summer of My German Soldier”. Teen Lit: Edgy or Over Edge
 

1934 births
2020 deaths
American children's writers
Columbia University alumni
Newbery Honor winners
Writers from Memphis, Tennessee
People from Parkin, Arkansas
Writers from Arkansas
American women novelists
American women children's writers
United Press International people
20th-century American novelists
20th-century American women writers
21st-century American novelists
21st-century American women writers
Jewish American novelists
20th-century American Jews
Novelists from Tennessee